The Fort Pitt Elementary School in Pittsburgh, Pennsylvania, is a building from 1905. It was listed on the National Register of Historic Places in 1986.

References

School buildings on the National Register of Historic Places in Pennsylvania
Tudor Revival architecture in Pennsylvania
School buildings completed in 1905
Buildings and structures in Allegheny County, Pennsylvania
Pittsburgh History & Landmarks Foundation Historic Landmarks
National Register of Historic Places in Pittsburgh
1905 establishments in Pennsylvania